Sergey Vasilyevich Vikulov (September 13, 1922 — July 1, 2006) was a Soviet and Russian poet, editor, and the Union of Soviet Writers' official.

Biography
Sergey Vikulov was born in the village of Yemelyanovskaya in Cherepovets Governorate into a poor peasant family. In October 1942, he volunteered for the Soviet Army and as a flak and artillery battery commander fought at the Kalinin, then Stalingrad Fronts. Later he became the 247th Zenith and Artillery regiment's Chief of Stuff's deputy and demobilized in the rank of a Guard captain, a chevalier of several high-profile military awards, including two Orders of the Red Star.

In the late 1940s Sergey Vikulov started to write poetry. In 1951 he graduated the Vologda State pedagogical institute's literary faculty and became the member of the Union of Writers of the USSR. In 1972, for his poem Alone Forever (1970) as well as The Plough and the Furrow (1972) collection he was awarded the RSFSR Maxim Gorky State Prize.

In 1959-1989 Vikulov edited , an influential conservative (neo-Slavophiliac) magazine set to propagate the traditional Russian values, as opposed to the Western-style liberal ideas. Among his best friends and allies were the authors who contributed to the magazine regularly: Viktor Astafyev, Valentin Rasputin, Fyodor Abramov, Vasily Belov, Yuri Bondarev, Vladimir Soloukhin. In 1990 he joined the group of authors who signed the anti-reformist "" which led to the break up of the Union of Soviet Writers and the formation of the 'patriotic' Union of Writers of Russia and the 'democratic' Union of Russian Writers.

Sergey Vikulov died on July 1, 2006, in Moscow. He was buried at the Troyekurovskoye Cemetery.

Select bibliography

Books of poetry
Beyond the Lake (1956)
There Will Be Good Weather (1961)
Bread and Salt (1965)
Bird-cherry Tree By the Window (1966)
Plough and Furrow (1972)
The Family Tree (1975)
Trace Left in the Field (1979)
Green Shoots (1982)

Major poems
In Blizzard (1955)
Galinka's Summer (1957)
Hard-earned Happiness (1958)
By Rights of a Fellow Countryman (1961)
The Overcoming (1962)
Windows Facing the Dawn (1964)
Against the Skies, On Earth (1967)
The Iv-Mountain (1969)
Forever Alone (1970)
The Thought of Motherland (1977)

References

1922 births
2006 deaths
20th-century Russian male writers
People from Belozersky District, Vologda Oblast
Communist Party of the Soviet Union members
Recipients of the Order of Friendship of Peoples
Recipients of the Order of the Red Banner of Labour
Recipients of the Order of the Red Star
Socialist realism writers
Russian magazine editors
Russian male poets
Russian male writers
Soviet editors
Soviet male poets
Soviet military personnel of World War II
Burials in Troyekurovskoye Cemetery